In the U.S. state of West Virginia, U.S. Route 40 (US 40) runs for  through the Northern Panhandle region. The highway enters the state on the Military Order of the Purple Heart bridge concurrent with US 250, crossing Wheeling Island, before joining Interstate 70 (I-70) over the Fort Henry Bridge before leaving the interstate. The highway travels north around Wheeling Hill, before traveling through the northeastern suburbs of Wheeling, Triadelphia and Valley Grove before entering Pennsylvania. A majority of the route still follows the old National Road which predates the U.S. Highway System.

Route description

History
Before the construction of I-70, US 40 continued southeast along Zane Street to Virginia Street, crossing the east channel of the Ohio River on the Wheeling Suspension Bridge.

Major intersections

See also

 Wheeling Suspension Bridge
 Wheeling, West Virginia

References

External links

 West Virginia
40
Transportation in Ohio County, West Virginia